P.K.P. (Pilsudski Bought Petliura) is a 1926 Soviet film directed by Aksel Lundin and Georgi Stabovoi.

Starring 
 Nikolai Kuchinsky as Symon Petliura
 Matvei Lyarov as Józef Piłsudski
 Yuriy Tyutyunnyk as Yuriy Tyutyunnyk (himself)
 Dmitri Erdman as Nakonechny
 Teodor Brainin as colonel Pulkovsky
 Sergei Kalinin as Petrenko
 Ivan Kapralov
 Vasili Lyudvinsky as Peasant boy
 Nikolai Nademsky
 Ivan Sizov as Nationalist underground
 M. Smolensky as Petliura general

References

External links 
 

1926 films
1920s Russian-language films
Soviet silent feature films
Soviet black-and-white films